was a province of Japan in the area of Japan that is today southern Gifu Prefecture. Mino was bordered by  Ōmi to the west, Echizen and Hida to the north,  and Shinano to the east, and   Ise, Mikawa, and Owari to the south. Under the Engishiki classification system, Mino was ranked as one of the 13 "great countries" (大国) in terms of importance, and one of the "near countries" (近国) in terms of distance from the capital. The provincial capital and ichinomiya were located in what is now the town of Tarui.

Historical record
"Mino" is an ancient place name, and appears in mokkan wooden tags from the ruins of Asuka-kyō, Fujiwara-kyō, and other ancient sites, but using the kanji "三野国". Per the Kujiki, there were originally three separate countries in Mino, centered around what is now Ōgaki, Ōno, and Kakamigahara. Each had its own Kuni no miyatsuko, and together with Motosu (in eastern Gifu) and Mugetsu (in north-central Gifu), these five entities were joined under Yamato rule to form the province of Mino. The use of the kanji "美濃" is found in the Kojiki and became prevalent in the Nara period. Early Mino included much of Kiso District in Shinano and portions of northern Owari. The route of the ancient Tōsandō highway connecting the ancient capitals of Japan and the eastern provinces passed through Mino, and even in 713 AD, records indicate that the road was widened to accommodate increasing numbers of travelers.

The Nihon Shoki and  Shoku Nihongi indicates that numerous immigrants from the hata clan and from Silla settled in Mino in the Asuka and Nara periods. 

During the Kamakura and Muromachi Period, the Toki clan held the position of shugo of Mino Province. During the Sengoku period, Saitō Dōsan usurped political power from the Toki, and later the province was conquered by Oda Nobunaga. The Battle of Sekigahara took place at the western edge of Mino, near the mountains between the Chūbu Region and the Kinki Region. With the establishment of the Tokugawa Shogunate, several feudal domains were established in Mino. At the time of the Meiji restoration, Mino was divided into 18 districts, which in turn were divided into 131 subdistricts and 1561 villages. The total assessed kokudaka of the province was 654,872 koku.

Historical districts
 Gifu Prefecture
 Anpachi District (安八郡) - absorbed parts of Taki District; but lost parts to Kaisai and Shimoishizu Districts to become Kaizu District (海津郡) on April 1, 1896
 Atsumi District (厚見郡) - merged with Kakami and parts of Katagata Districts to become Inaba District (稲葉郡) on April 1, 1896
 Ena District (恵那郡) - dissolved
 Fuwa District (不破郡)
 Gujō District (郡上郡) - dissolved
 Haguri District (羽栗郡) - merged with Nakashima District to become Hashima District (羽島郡) on April 1, 1896
 Ikeda District (池田郡) - merged with parts of Ōno (Mino) Districts to become Ibi District (揖斐郡) on April 1, 1896
 Ishizu District (石津郡)
 Kamiishizu District (上石津郡) - merged with parts of Taki District to become Yōrō District (養老郡) on April 1, 1896
 Shimoishizu District (下石津郡) - merged with Kaisai and parts of Anpachi Districts to become Kaizu District on April 1, 1896
 Kaisai District (海西郡) - merged with Shimoishizu and parts of Anpachi Districts to become Kaizu District on April 1, 1896
 Kakami District (各務郡) - merged with Atsumi and parts of Katagata Districts to become Inaba District on April 1, 1896
 Kamo District (加茂郡)
 Kani District (可児郡)
 Katagata District (石津郡) - dissolved to split and merged into parts of Inaba, Motosu and Yamagata Districts on April 1, 1896
 Mugi District (武儀郡) - dissolved
 Mushiroda District (席田郡) - merged with former Motosu, parts of Katagata and parts of Ōno (Mino) Districts to become Motosu District (本巣郡) on April 1, 1896
 Nakashima District (中島郡) - merged with Haguri District to become Hashima District on April 1, 1896
 Ōno District (Mino) (大野郡) - dissolved to split and merged into parts of Motosu and Ibi Districts on April 1, 1896
 Taki District (石津郡) - dissolved to split and merged into parts of Yōrō and Anpachi Districts on April 1, 1896
 Toki District (土岐郡) - dissolved
 Yamagata District (山県郡) - absorbed parts of Katagata District on April 1, 1896; now dissolved

Shugo
Below is an incomplete list of the shugo who controlled Mino Province and the years of their control:

Kamakura shogunate
 Ōuchi Koreyoshi (大内惟義), 1187–1211
 Ōuchi Korenobu (大内惟信), until 1221
 Utunomiya Yasutsuna (宇都宮泰綱), from 1252
 Hōjō clan, from 1285
 Hōjō Tokimura (北条時村), 1296–1300
 Hōjō Masataka (北条政高), until 1333

Muromachi shogunate
 Toki Yorisada (土岐頼貞), 1336–1339
 Toki Yoritō (土岐頼遠), 1339–1342
 Toki Yoriyasu (土岐頼康), 1342–1387
 Toki Yasuyuki (土岐康行), 1387–1389
 Toki Yoritada (土岐頼忠), 1390–1394
 Toki Yorimasu (土岐頼益), 1395–1414
 Toki Mochimasu (土岐持益), 1422–1465
 Toki Shigeyori (土岐成頼), 1468–1495
 Toki Masafusa (土岐政房), 1495–1519
 Toki Yorinari (土岐頼芸), 1519–1542

Edo period Domains

Geography
Mino and Owari provinces were separated by the Sakai River, which means "border river."

Notes

References
 Nussbaum, Louis-Frédéric and Käthe Roth. (2005).  Japan encyclopedia. Cambridge: Harvard University Press. ;  OCLC 58053128
 Titsingh, Isaac. (1834).  Annales des empereurs du Japon (Nihon Odai Ichiran). Paris: Royal Asiatic Society, Oriental Translation Fund of Great Britain and Ireland. OCLC 5850691.

Other websites

  Murdoch's map of provinces, 1903

 
History of Gifu Prefecture